Drug Houses of Australia (DHA) was originally established in 1936 as an amalgamation of seven Australian pharmaceutical companies, notably A. M. Bickford & Sons. In 1970, DHA was taken over by the British bank Slater Walker.

Drug Houses of Australia is now a leading generic pharmaceutics and Chinese proprietary medicine (CPM) manufacturer based in Jurong, Singapore.

It was sold to Strides Arcolab through a share purchase agreement with Haw Par Healthcare Limited, Singapore in September 2006 for approximately SGD$19.7 million.

It is currently a part of Strides Arcolab which is listed on both the Indian stock exchanges Bombay Stock Exchange (BSE) and the National Stock Exchange (NSE).

References

External links
Drug Houses of Australia Website
Strides Arcolab Website
Haw Par Website

Pharmaceutical companies of Australia
Pharmaceutical companies of Singapore